The Severnside Community Rail Partnership is a community rail partnership covering the network of routes radiating from Bristol, bounded by Gloucester, Bath/Freshford, Weston-super-Mare, Taunton, and the Severn Estuary. It was founded in 2004, and is principally sponsored by local councils.

See also 
 Friends of Suburban Bristol Railways

References

External links 
  Official website

Rail transport in Bristol
Politics of Bristol
Transport advocacy groups of the United Kingdom
2004 establishments in England
Rail transport in Somerset
Organisations based in Bristol